Seybou Koita (born 15 April 1994) is a Nigerien professional footballer who plays as a forward for Oman Elite League club Oman Club and the Niger national team.

Club career
Koita arrived in France aged 5, but did not start playing football until much later. He first played for a club in Neuilly-sur-Seine, where he was solicited by a number of professional clubs. He signed for Orléans and within two years was rewarded with a professional contract. He made his debut for the club in the Championnat National game against Amiens SC on 16 August 2013, when he came on as a stoppage time substitute. Injury kept him out of most of the season, and when Orléans were promoted to Ligue 2 he found himself fifth choice, so did not get much game time. His full debut came on 22 May 2015 in a 1–0 win over Sochaux, the only start of his Orléans career. At the end of the 2014–15 Ligue 2 season, Orléans were relegated, and Koita left the club and signed for Hapoel Ashkelon of the Israeli Liga Leumit (second tier).

A foot injury, and visa issues, cut short his stay in Israel, and he spent time training with Red Star and trialling with Dunkerque before signing a six-month professional contract with Amiens SC in December 2016. In July 2017 he extended his contract with the club for a further two years.

Koita left Amiens in January 2019 and spent more time in Israel during the second half of the 2018–19 season, with Ashdod. In September 2019 he returned to France with Red Star.

International career
Koita made his debut for the Niger national team on 23 March 2019 in an Africa Cup qualifier against Egypt, as a 67th-minute substitute for Issa Modibo Sidibé.

Personal life
Koita holds dual Niger-Mali nationality.

Career statistics

References

External links

1994 births
Living people
People from Niamey
Association football forwards
Nigerien footballers
Niger international footballers
Nigerien people of Malian descent
Ligue 1 players
Ligue 2 players
Championnat National players
Championnat National 3 players
Israeli Premier League players
Liga Leumit players
Championnat National 2 players
US Orléans players
Hapoel Ashkelon F.C. players
Amiens SC players
F.C. Ashdod players
Red Star F.C. players
Andrézieux-Bouthéon FC players
Nigerien expatriate footballers
Expatriate footballers in Israel
Nigerien expatriate sportspeople in Israel
Expatriate footballers in France
Nigerien expatriate sportspeople in France